Joseph Palmer (1716–1788) was an American general during the American Revolutionary War.

Palmer was born at Shaugh Prior, Devonshire, England, on March 31, 1716, a son of John and Joan Palmer, née Pearse. He married Mary Cranch on the April 4, 1746, at Ermington and emigrated to Massachusetts later that year with his brother-in-law Richard Cranch.

In 1752 they built a glassworks in Germantown, now a part of Quincy, Massachusetts. Later they built a chocolate mill and spermaceti and salt factories. By the 1770s Palmer had become a supporter of American independence. He fought in the Battle of Lexington and served in the Massachusetts Provincial Congress and on the Cambridge Committee of Safety. He sent Israel Bissell on his ride to warn that the war with Britain had begun. He received a commission as a colonel in the Massachusetts militia and as brigadier for Suffolk County, Massachusetts, in 1776. He went on intelligence-gathering missions in Vermont and Rhode Island and, as brigadier-general, led a failed attack on Newport, Rhode Island. After the war, he returned to his businesses. Heavy debt forced him to leave Germantown and he started a salt factory on the Boston Neck in 1784. Palmer died four years later at his home in Dorchester, Massachusetts, on December 25, 1788.

Wednesday morning near 10 of the clock - Watertown. To all the friends of American liberty be it known that this morning before break of day, a brigade, consisting of about 1,000 to 1,200 men landed at Phip's Farm at Cambridge and marched to Lexington, where they found a company of our colony militia in arms, upon whom they fired without any provocation and killed six men and wounded four others. By an express from Boston, we find another brigade are now upon their march from Boston supposed to be about 1,000. The Bearer, Israel Bissell, is charged to alarm the country quite to Connecticut and all persons are desired to furnish him with fresh horses as they may be needed. I have spoken with several persons who have seen the dead and wounded. Pray let the delegates from this colony to Connecticut see this. J. Palmer, one of the Committee of Safety.

References
Allen Johnson and Dumas Malone, eds., Dictionary of American Biography. New York: Scribner's (1937)

1716 births
1788 deaths
People from South Hams (district)
British emigrants to the Thirteen Colonies
Militia generals in the American Revolution
Massachusetts militiamen in the American Revolution